The Silurian is a geologic period and system spanning 24.6 million years from the end of the Ordovician Period, at  million years ago (Mya), to the beginning of the Devonian Period,  Mya. The Silurian is the shortest period of the Paleozoic Era. As with other geologic periods, the rock beds that define the period's start and end are well identified, but the exact dates are uncertain by a few million years. The base of the Silurian is set at a series of major Ordovician–Silurian extinction events when up to 60% of marine genera were wiped out.

One important event in this period was the initial establishment of terrestrial life in what is known as the Silurian-Devonian Terrestrial Revolution: vascular plants emerged from more primitive land plants, dikaryan fungi started expanding and diversifying along with glomeromycotan fungi, and three groups of arthropods (myriapods, arachnids and hexapods) became fully terrestrialized.

A significant evolutionary milestone during the Silurian was the diversification of jawed fish and bony fish.

History of study 

The Silurian system was first identified by British geologist Roderick Murchison, who was examining fossil-bearing sedimentary rock strata in south Wales in the early 1830s. He named the sequences for a Celtic tribe of Wales, the Silures, inspired by his friend Adam Sedgwick, who had named the period of his study the Cambrian, from the Latin name for Wales. This naming does not indicate any correlation between the occurrence of the Silurian rocks and the land inhabited by the Silures (. Geologic map of Wales, Map of pre-Roman tribes of Wales). In 1835 the two men presented a joint paper, under the title On the Silurian and Cambrian Systems, Exhibiting the Order in which the Older Sedimentary Strata Succeed each other in England and Wales, which was the germ of the modern geological time scale. As it was first identified, the "Silurian" series when traced farther afield quickly came to overlap Sedgwick's "Cambrian" sequence, however, provoking furious disagreements that ended the friendship.

Charles Lapworth resolved the conflict by defining a new Ordovician system including the contested beds. An alternative name for the Silurian was "Gotlandian" after the strata of the Baltic island of Gotland.

The French geologist Joachim Barrande, building on Murchison's work, used the term Silurian in a more comprehensive sense than was justified by subsequent knowledge. He divided the Silurian rocks of Bohemia into eight stages. His interpretation was questioned in 1854 by Edward Forbes, and the later stages of Barrande; F, G and H have since been shown to be Devonian. Despite these modifications in the original groupings of the strata, it is recognized that Barrande established Bohemia as a classic ground for the study of the earliest Silurian fossils.

Subdivisions

Paleogeography

With the supercontinent Gondwana covering the equator and much of the southern hemisphere, a large ocean occupied most of the northern half of the globe. The high sea levels of the Silurian and the relatively flat land (with few significant mountain belts) resulted in a number of island chains, and thus a rich diversity of environmental settings.

During the Silurian, Gondwana continued a slow southward drift to high southern latitudes, but there is evidence that the Silurian icecaps were less extensive than those of the late-Ordovician glaciation. The southern continents remained united during this period. The melting of icecaps and glaciers contributed to a rise in sea level, recognizable from the fact that Silurian sediments overlie eroded Ordovician sediments, forming an unconformity. The continents of Avalonia, Baltica, and Laurentia drifted together near the equator, starting the formation of a second supercontinent known as Euramerica.

When the proto-Europe collided with North America, the collision folded coastal sediments that had been accumulating since the Cambrian off the east coast of North America and the west coast of Europe. This event is the Caledonian orogeny, a spate of mountain building that stretched from New York State through conjoined Europe and Greenland to Norway. At the end of the Silurian, sea levels dropped again, leaving telltale basins of evaporites extending from Michigan to West Virginia, and the new mountain ranges were rapidly eroded. The Teays River, flowing into the shallow mid-continental sea, eroded Ordovician Period strata, forming deposits of Silurian strata in northern Ohio and Indiana.

The vast ocean of Panthalassa covered most of the northern hemisphere. Other minor oceans include two phases of the Tethys, the Proto-Tethys and Paleo-Tethys, the Rheic Ocean, the Iapetus Ocean (a narrow seaway between Avalonia and Laurentia), and the newly formed Ural Ocean.

Climate and sea level
The Silurian period was once believed to have enjoyed relatively stable and warm temperatures, in contrast with the extreme glaciations of the Ordovician before it and the extreme heat of the ensuing Devonian; however, it is now known that the global climate underwent many drastic fluctuations throughout the Silurian, evidenced by numerous major carbon and oxygen isotope excursions during this geologic period. Sea levels rose from their Hirnantian low throughout the first half of the Silurian; they subsequently fell throughout the rest of the period, although smaller scale patterns are superimposed on this general trend; fifteen high-stands (periods when sea levels were above the edge of the continental shelf) can be identified, and the highest Silurian sea level was probably around  higher than the lowest level reached.

During this period, the Earth entered a warm greenhouse phase, supported by high CO2 levels of 4500 ppm, and warm shallow seas covered much of the equatorial land masses. Early in the Silurian, glaciers retreated back into the South Pole until they almost disappeared in the middle of Silurian. Layers of broken shells (called coquina) provide strong evidence of a climate dominated by violent storms generated then as now by warm sea surfaces.

Perturbations 
The climate and carbon cycle appear to be rather unsettled during the Silurian, which had a higher frequency of isotopic excursions (indicative of climate fluctuations) than any other period. The Ireviken event, Mulde event and Lau event each represent isotopic excursions following a minor mass extinction and associated with rapid sea-level change. Each one leaves a similar signature in the geological record, both geochemically and biologically; pelagic (free-swimming) organisms were particularly hard hit, as were brachiopods, corals and trilobites, and extinctions rarely occur in a rapid series of fast bursts. The climate fluctuations are best explained by a sequence of glaciations, but the lack of tillites in the middle to late Silurian make this explanation problematic.

Flora and fauna
The Silurian period has been viewed by some palaeontologists as an extended recovery interval following the Late Ordovician mass extinction, which interrupted the cascading increase in biodiversity that had continuously gone on throughout the Cambrian and most of the Ordovician.

The Silurian was the first period to see megafossils of extensive terrestrial biota in the form of moss-like miniature forests along lakes and streams and networks of large, mycorrhizal nematophytes, heralding the beginning of the Silurian-Devonian Terrestrial Revolution. However, the land fauna did not have a major impact on the Earth until it diversified in the Devonian.

The first fossil records of vascular plants, that is, land plants with tissues that carry water and food, appeared in the second half of the Silurian Period. The earliest-known representatives of this group are Cooksonia. Most of the sediments containing Cooksonia are marine in nature. Preferred habitats were likely along rivers and streams. The plant shows a high degree of development in relation to the age of its fossil remains. Fossils of this plant have been recorded in Australia, Canada, and China. Eohostimella heathana is an early, probably terrestrial, "plant" known from compression fossils of Early Silurian (Llandovery) age. The chemistry of its fossils is similar to that of fossilised vascular plants, rather than algae.

The earliest-known animals fully adapted to terrestrial conditions appear during the Mid-Silurian, including the millipede Pneumodesmus. Some evidence also suggests the presence of predatory trigonotarbid arachnoids and myriapods in Late Silurian facies. Predatory invertebrates would indicate that simple food webs were in place that included non-predatory prey animals. Extrapolating back from Early Devonian biota, Andrew Jeram et al. in 1990 suggested a food web based on as-yet-undiscovered detritivores and grazers on micro-organisms.

The first bony fish, the Osteichthyes, appeared, represented by the Acanthodians covered with bony scales. Fish reached considerable diversity and developed movable jaws, adapted from the supports of the front two or three gill arches. A diverse fauna of eurypterids (sea scorpions)—some of them several meters in length—prowled the shallow Silurian seas of North America; many of their fossils have been found in New York state. Leeches also made their appearance during the Silurian Period. Brachiopods, bryozoa, molluscs, hederelloids, tentaculitoids, crinoids and trilobites were abundant and diverse. Endobiotic symbionts were common in the corals and stromatoporoids.

Reef abundance was patchy; sometimes, fossils are frequent, but at other points, are virtually absent from the rock record.

Notes

References
Emiliani, Cesare. (1992). Planet Earth : Cosmology, Geology, & the Evolution of Life & the Environment. Cambridge University Press. (Paperback Edition )
 Mikulic, DG, DEG Briggs, and J Kluessendorf. 1985. A new exceptionally preserved biota from the Lower Silurian of Wisconsin, USA. Philosophical Transactions of the Royal Society of London, 311B:75-86.

External links

 Ogg, Jim (June 2004), Overview of Global Boundary Stratotype Sections and Points (GSSP's)
Palaeos: Silurian
UCMP Berkeley: The Silurian
Paleoportal: Silurian strata in U.S., state by state
USGS:Silurian and Devonian Rocks (U.S.)
 
 Examples of Silurian Fossils
GeoWhen Database for the Silurian
Silurian (Chronostratography scale)

 
Geological periods